Bredaryd is a locality situated in Värnamo Municipality, Jönköping County, Sweden with 1,466 inhabitants in 2010.

Notable people

Anna Anvegård - footballer
Allan Larsson - politician

References 

Populated places in Jönköping County
Populated places in Värnamo Municipality
Finnveden